Caina is a genus of snout moths. It was described by Émile Louis Ragonot in 1893.

Species
Caina deletella Ragonot, 1893
Caina micrella Ragonot, 1893

References

Phycitinae
Taxa named by Émile Louis Ragonot
Pyralidae genera